Brian Wright (born March 24, 1995) is a Canadian professional soccer player who plays as a forward for York United.

Early life
Wright was born in Toronto and moved to Ajax with his family at age four. He played most of his youth soccer with local club Ajax SC.

Club career

Early career
Wright spent his entire college career at the University of Vermont playing for its men's soccer team between 2013 and 2016. While at Vermont, Wright scored 39 goals and tallied 25 assists in 80 appearances while leading the Catamounts to back-to-back NCAA Tournament appearances in 2015 and 2016. He racked up numerous accolades including America East Conference Rookie of the Year in 2013, and was a three-time America East first team all-conference selection from his sophomore to senior years. Wright was also a multiple time NSCAA all-region selection, as well as a second team All-America selection in 2016 and was named a Hermann Trophy semifinalist. Wright finished his UVM career second all-time in points with 103, second all-time in goals, and third all-time in games played while also setting the single season record for points with 40.

While at Vermont, Wright appeared for USL PDL side Burlingame Dragons during their 2016 season.

New England Revolution
On January 13, 2017, Wright was selected in the first round (20th overall) of the 2017 MLS SuperDraft by New England Revolution. On March 30, 2017, Wright was sent on loan to United Soccer League side Tulsa Roughnecks. He made his professional debut on April 1, 2017 as a 60th-minute substitute during a 1-0 win against Rio Grande Valley FC Toros. Wright made his Revolution debut in the 2017 Lamar Hunt U.S. Open Cup fourth round with a start against the Rochester Rhinos in a 3-0 victory. In the following US Open Cup fifth round matchup against D.C. United, Wright scored his first professional goal helping the Revolution to a 2-1 win in the competition. On July 2, 2017, Wright made his MLS debut as a substitute in the 53rd minute in a 3-0 loss to the Philadelphia Union. Upon conclusion of the 2017 season, the Revolution would announce they would not exercise Wright's contract option for the 2018 season. However, he re-signed with the club on December 15, 2017.

On 15 March 2019, Wright was loaned to USL Championship side Birmingham Legion FC. The loan is open-ended and allows the Revolution to recall Wright at any time. Wright would have his option for the 2020 season declined by New England, ending his time with the club after three seasons.

Birmingham Legion
Following his release from New England, Wright signed a permanent multi-year deal with Birmingham Legion. He left Birmingham following the 2020 season.

Atlético Ottawa
On April 27, 2021, Wright signed with Canadian Premier League side Atlético Ottawa. In his first season with the club he was the second-highest scorer on the team, scoring six goals, but Ottawa finished the season in last place. Wright stayed with the club for the 2022 season, with higher expectations, and scored Ottawa's first goal of the year, a late penalty in the club's 1-0 home opener victory against Cavalry FC.

York United
In January 2022, York United announced they had signed Wright to a two-year deal.

Honours

Atlético Ottawa 
 Canadian Premier League
Regular Season: 2022

Career statistics

References

External links

1995 births
Living people
Association football forwards
Canadian soccer players
Soccer players from Toronto
People from Ajax, Ontario
Black Canadian soccer players
Canadian expatriate soccer players
Expatriate soccer players in the United States
Canadian expatriate sportspeople in the United States
Vermont Catamounts men's soccer players
Burlingame Dragons FC players
New England Revolution draft picks
New England Revolution players
FC Tulsa players
Birmingham Legion FC players
Atlético Ottawa players
USL League Two players
Major League Soccer players
USL Championship players